Hurricane Earl was the first major hurricane to threaten New England since Hurricane Bob in 1991. The fifth named storm of the season, Earl originated from a tropical wave to west of the Cape Verde Islands on August 25, 2010. Tracking nearly due west, the system attained tropical storm intensity within hours of genesis. The storm intensified into a hurricane on August 29 and later a major hurricane on August 30 as it brushed the Leeward Islands. A temporary weakening trend took place as Earl moved northwestward, contributed to moderate southwesterly wind shear, but intensification later resumed by September 1. Accelerating northeastward, the system briefly weakened to a tropical storm before reattaining hurricane strength as it made landfall near Western Head, Nova Scotia. After traversing the peninsula, the hurricane became extratropical and was later absorbed by a larger low pressure area on September 6, while located north of Newfoundland.

In the Lesser Antilles, the storm brought strong winds, damaging houses and toppling trees, signs, and power lines, resulting in hundreds of thousands of electrical outages. Heavy rainfall led to flooding, inundating streets and leaving waist-deep water on some islands. One death occurred in Antigua and Barbuda when a person was electrocuted while attempting to restore power. The region was inflicted with at least $40.8 million (2010 USD) in damage. Along the coast of the Eastern United States, tropical storm-force winds affected portions of North Carolina and Massachusetts; however, little damage resulted, totaling about $3.8 million in the Outer Banks. Six fatalities were confirmed in the United States as a result of rip currents and rough seas; three in Florida, two in New Jersey and one in Massachusetts. In Nova Scotia, Canada, where Earl made landfall as a Category 1 hurricane, one person drowned and hundreds of thousands of people lost power for days.

Meteorological history 

Earl formed in a well-organized area of low pressure and moved into the Atlantic Ocean as a vigorous tropical wave on early August 22. After moving off the west coast of Africa, a surface low started to develop near the area of thunderstorms. The surface low was able to organize the area of thunderstorms, allowing deep convection to occur near it. Six hours later, at about 2100 UTC, the system's maximum sustained winds were estimated to be . Accordingly, the depression was declared to have become the fifth tropical storm of the season, and received the name Earl.

Earl was forecast to head westward while gradually strengthening under the influence of low wind shear and warm ocean temperatures. However, dry air caught in Earl's circulation precluded additional intensification, causing the storm to maintain  maximum sustained winds for 36 hours. On August 29, the storm resumed gradual intensification, even though wind shear increased due to the outflow from nearby Hurricane Danielle. The wind shear caused Earl's low level center of circulation to become exposed, limiting Earl's intensification to  maximum sustained winds during the following 12 hours. As the storm neared the Leeward Islands, convection increased around Earl and defined banding features formed.

Hurricane Earl's outflow steadily improved through August 30 and sustained winds rose above , making Earl a Category 2 storm. Several hours later, the storm further intensified into a major hurricane. That afternoon, Earl became a Category 4 hurricane, attaining winds of  before leveling out in intensity. A northwestward track began to become apparent by this time as the system neared the southwestern periphery of a subtropical ridge over the Atlantic Ocean. Early on August 31, an eyewall replacement cycle, a process in which a storm's eye dissipates and is replaced by a larger one, began to take place. Despite increasing wind shear, the system maintained its intensity through September 1, when it briefly weakened to a Category 3 system. Gradual strengthening took place throughout the day as the eye became better defined and convection deepened around the center. Additionally, the storm began to turn northward in response to the ridge over the Atlantic and a strong trough over the Great Lakes.

During the afternoon of September 2, Earl finally succumbed to the effects of increased shear and cooler water temperatures. Embedded within the mid-latitude westerlies, a gradual northeasterly turn was expected over the following day, preventing Earl from making landfall along the East Coast of the United States. Further weakening took place throughout the day as convection weakened and the eye dissipated. Earl was downgraded to a tropical storm that evening; however, the central pressure remained at an unusually low 958 mbar (hPa; 28.29 inHg). Continuing northeastward, Earl neared the Canadian Maritimes, re-strengthening slightly and regaining hurricane intensity as it approached the region. After crossing Prince Edward Island, the storm entered the Gulf of Saint Lawrence. There, the system finally transitioned into a post-tropical storm as its windfield became asymmetric and the eastern portion of the circulation became associated with a frontal system.

Research 

As Hurricane Earl tracked along the East Coast of the United States, a new program, the Genesis and Rapid Intensification Processes (GRIP), was launched. Additionally, routine Hurricane Hunter missions were flown into Earl, a DC-8 and the first use of an unmanned research drone. Combined, these missions made Hurricane Earl the most studied tropical cyclone in history, according to Tim Miller, the lead scientist in GRIP. The outcome of the extensive research allowed for substantially improved forecasts during the latter part of Earl's existence. As compared to a similar storm, Hurricane Floyd in 1999, warnings covered roughly  less coastline, saving residents and businesses roughly $1 billion in evacuation losses.

In Anegada, a geological study, focusing on beach deposits from two significant wash-out events between 1650 and 1800, was given additional research material by the storm. Deposits left behind by the major hurricane were substantially less than the time period being studied. This led researchers to determine that a tsunami was likely the cause, rather than a hurricane. This also allowed for a connection to the 1755 Lisbon earthquake to be confirmed.

Preparations

Caribbean 
On August 27, France issued a tropical storm watch for the French side of Saint Martin and Saint Barthélemy. The next day, Antigua and Barbuda and the Netherlands Antilles issued tropical storm watches for Antigua, Barbuda, Montserrat, St Kitts and Nevis and Anguilla and for Sint Maarten, Saba and Sint Eustatius. Hours later, most of the watches were upgraded to tropical storm warnings; a tropical storm watch was also issued for the United States Virgin Islands. By August 28, hurricane warnings were in place for the areas between Anguilla and Montserrat; hurricane watches were declared for the U.S. and British Virgin Islands as well as Puerto Rico. As Earl moved closer to the northeastern Caribbean, warnings were extended westward through the Virgin Islands.

Throughout the Leeward Islands, heavy rains produced by the storm flooded low-lying areas.
During the late morning of August 30, some of the hurricane warnings were replaced by tropical storm warnings; the Turks and Caicos islands were also placed under a tropical storm watch. Several hours later, all warnings for Antigua and Barbuda were discontinued. That afternoon, all hurricane advisories were discontinued as Earl moved away from the Caribbean islands. By August 31, the remaining advisories for the Caribbean were discontinued; the Turks and Caicos were also placed under a tropical storm warning. Early on September 1, the Government of the Bahamas discontinued all advisories in relation to Hurricane Earl.

Beginning on August 28, local governments placed emergency agencies on standby for possible damage from Hurricane Earl. Press releases were made to the public in order to give sufficient time for preparations. The following day, emergency shelters were opened on Anguilla, Antigua, Barbuda, Montserrat, St. Kitts, Nevis and the Virgin Islands. On St. Kitts and Nevis, the Robert L. Bradshaw International Airport and Vance W. Amory International Airport were shut down and scheduled to re-open the following day. All emergency services were placed on standby on Anguilla, Antigua and Barbuda. Prior to Earl's arrival in the Leeward Islands, the Leeward Islands Air Transport canceled 42 flights to and from the region. The V. C. Bird International Airport on Antigua was closed on August 29 and set to reopen after the storm passes. Although not in the direct path of Hurricane Earl, officials in the Dominican Republic prompted evacuations of coastal towns and canceled flights across the country.

United States 

As Hurricane Earl moved away from the eastern Caribbean on August 31, the NHC began issuing storm watches for the United States East Coast. That day, a hurricane watch was issued for areas of North Carolina between Surf City and the Virginia border. A tropical storm watch was also issued south of this area to Cape Fear. The next day, a hurricane warning was issued for parts of the North Carolina coastline between Bogue Banks to the Virginia border and the hurricane watch was extended northward to Cape Henlopen, Delaware. Further watches and warnings were issued throughout the day, covering an increasingly large region of the coastline. By September 2, these advisories encompassed much of the East Coast from Bogue Banks, North Carolina to the United States-Canada border in northern Maine. A spokesman for the NHC, Dennis Feltgen, stated that not since Hurricane Bob in 1991 had such a large region of the U.S. East Coast been under threat from a hurricane. Cape Cod, Massachusetts was placed under a hurricane warning by this time and this remained in place until Earl was downgraded to a tropical storm the following day. The advisories gradually lessened in coverage as the storm moved away from the United States. The last warning in northern Maine remained in effect until the morning of September 4 when Earl approached landfall in Nova Scotia.

On August 30, emergency officials in Massachusetts began early-stage emergency plans, ensuring that all communities had shelters, generators, sand bags and other disaster prevention materials. Officials in New York and New Jersey also responded to the threat of Earl. Evacuation plans were readied for Long Island and New York City; emergency officers in New Jersey also discussed the possibility of evacuating residents from low-lying areas along the coastline. Having experienced a fatality from a distant Hurricane Danielle earlier in August, officials in Maryland took the threat of Earl seriously. An estimated 250,000 people were expected to travel to the region for the Labor Day weekend, increasing the risk of loss of life from rip currents. Daily conference calls between state officials also began on August 30.
An administrator of the Federal Emergency Management Agency, Craig Fugate, cautioned that Earl's approach warranted a reminder for evacuation plans to be updated for the U.S. east coast, noting "It wouldn't take much to have the storm come ashore somewhere on the coast. The message is for everyone to pay attention."

On August 31, mandatory evacuations began on North Carolina's Ocracoke Island. "I don't remember the last time there was a mandatory evacuation order for the island," stated Commissioner Kenneth Collier of Hyde County. Mandatory evacuations were also issued for Hatteras Island on September 1, with a total of 30,000 residents and visitors affected. On September 1, state of emergency declarations were issued by the governors of Maryland, North Carolina, and Virginia. Naval Station Norfolk was put under orders to be ready to depart port within 24 hours if necessary. The following day, Governor Deval Patrick declared a state of emergency for Massachusetts. NSTAR deployed crews from Michigan to Cape Cod. The ferry to Nantucket was stopping service Friday morning. Chatham, Massachusetts was under a voluntary evacuation order. Several school districts in Rhode Island released students from school early on September 3, as well as Bristol-Warren and Cumberland school Districts, which closed schools in anticipation of Hurricane Earl.

Canada 
On September 2, the Canadian Hurricane Center issued a hurricane watch for areas in Nova Scotia between Medway Harbour and Digby as well as a tropical storm watch from the edges of the hurricane watch to Ecum Secum and Fort Lawrence. Later that day, the tropical storm watch was expanded northward to Point Tupper and a new one was issued for Prince Edward Island and parts of eastern New Brunswick. Early on September 3, a tropical storm warning was issued for areas between Lismore and Ecum Secum as well as Prince Edward Island. The following day, the hurricane watch in Nova Scotia was shifted to include areas between Ecum Secum and Point Tupper and the tropical storm watch in New Brunswick was discontinued. Later on September 4, much of Nova Scotia was under a tropical storm warning. These warnings were later discontinued as Earl moved northward through Atlantic Canada; however, a new tropical storm warning was issued for parts of Newfoundland between Burgeo and Boat Harbour. Following the storm's transition into an extratropical cyclone, all warnings were discontinued in Canada.

Earl was predicted to have an 80% chance of striking Nova Scotia (60% chance as a hurricane) since the end of August. This enabled emergency preparations to begin nearly a week before Earl made landfall. On September 2, the Red Cross placed over 900 volunteers on standby.
Because anticipated landfall would take place at low neap tide and storm surge would be minimal, no mandatory evacuation orders were issued, although some marinas required boats to be moved to safer mooring. Tourists in the area were warned of the likely impact of the coming storm by the Department of Tourism, Culture and Heritage. Virtually all permanent residents stayed and prepared to be without electricity for a couple of days. While ferries in the area were cancelled, the Confederation Bridge linking New Brunswick and Prince Edward Island was not closed. However, high-sided vehicles and motorcycles were barred from crossing for six hours at the height of the storm.

Impact

Caribbean

Antigua and Barbuda 
According to officials in Antigua and Barbuda, the entire island of Antigua was left without power due to Hurricane Earl. High winds felled numerous trees and signs as well as damaged homes. At least one home was destroyed on the island, forcing the evacuation of eight people. An estimated  of rain fell in the country, resulting in widespread flooding. In Bolans Village, seven people had to be rescued after wading into waist-deep water. Following the passage of Earl, Philmore Mullin, Director of the National Office of Disaster Services, expressed his concern for the lack of action taken by residents prior to the hurricane's arrival. A country-wide holiday was declared for August 30 by Governor General Dame Louise Lake-Tack to help cleanup efforts run more efficiently. Health officials advised residents to also boil their water to avoid water-borne diseases until further notice. One person was killed in relation to the storm after being electrocuted while trying to restore power.

Throughout Antigua and Barbuda, losses from the hurricane amounted to EC$34 million (US$12.6 million). In the wake of Earl, the International Federation of Red Cross and Red Crescent Societies allocated roughly $50,000 (USD) in relief funds for the country. A three-month recovery operation was implemented within days of the storm's passage and focused on providing shelter and sustenance for the 1,000 families displaced by Earl. Additionally, economic assistance due to substantial crop losses was required, especially for families who depend on agriculture.

Guadeloupe and the French islands 
In Saint Martin the highest gust reach  on the French side as the minimal pressure record at 983.3 mb in Grand Case and the total rainfall was 98,0 mm. Across those islands of Saint Martin, Saint Barthelemy and Guadeloupe, 7,500 people were left without power.
Damages was moderate : trees and power lines were felled across the island, leaving most residents without power. Some roof damage was sustained by homes on the island as well.

Saint Kitts and Nevis 
Several streets were also flooded throughout the area. Widespread power outages affected many residents on the island, some of whom remained without electricity for 24 hours.

British Leeward Islands 
On Dominica, three minor earthquakes, one measuring 2.7 on the Richter magnitude scale, struck the island during Earl's passage. In Montserrat, moderate damage took place as a result of Earl. Torrential rains, amounting to  triggered several landslides and flooding. No structural damage took place; however, roads, trees and power lines were impacted. Initial assessments from officials indicated that losses reached EC$10 million (US$3.7 million).

In the British territories of Anguilla and the British Virgin Islands, power and water supply was lost to the entire Territory; several vessels on Tortola were grounded. On Anguilla, the highest wind gust reach . Three homes were destroyed and 25 others were damaged by the storm. Throughout the British Virgin Islands, losses amounted to $7 million. Hotels throughout the area suffered extensive losses, with three losing $300,000 in damage. In the wake of Earl, the Caribbean Catastrophe Risk Insurance Facility provided Anguilla with $4.3 million for cleanup and repair operations.

Puerto Rico and the U.S. Virgin Islands 
Many residents across the islands were left without power for up to a week as a result of the storm. Following an assessment of the damage, total losses were placed at $2.5 million, allowing the governor of the U.S. V.I. to request for a major disaster declaration from the United States government. This request was later approved by President Barack Obama in late September. In addition to damage to infrastructure, severe losses were sustained in the business sector. As a result of Earl's passage through the region, nearly 22,000 vacationers canceled their plans, resulting in a $10.7 million loss in revenue. In March 2011, the Federal Emergency Management Agency (FEMA) granted $555,219 in public assistance funding to cover the costs from Earl in the Virgin Islands.

Heavy rains also began to affect Puerto Rico during the early afternoon on August 30 as Hurricane Earl moved closer to the island. In San Juan,  of rain fell during the passage of Earl. Dozens of roads were shut down across the island due to flooding and downed power lines. At the height of the storm, roughly 187,000 residences were left without power and 60,000 more were without water. A landslide triggered by heavy rains covered a portion of Puerto Rico Highway 191, temporarily closing the road.

United States 

Throughout the United States, damage from Hurricane Earl was generally minor. Insurance modelers for catastrophes estimated that losses from the storm would not exceed $100 million in the country. According to the federal procurement data system, roughly $300,000 was given by FEMA in relief funds throughout the United States.

Southeast 
Off the coast of Florida, near the Bahamas, one person went missing and is believed to have drowned after encountering  waves produced by Earl. Near Jupiter Inlet, a man fell off his ship during rough seas. Lifeguards found him unconscious and transported him to a nearby hospital where he died on September 7. On September 4, a third person died in Volusia County after being caught in a rip current; more than 200 rescues were made by lifeguards in the county during the day. On September 4, rip currents produced by Earl resulted in the rescue of 20 to 30 people on the island. Offshore, a sailors lost control of their boat amidst the rough seas and crashed into a pier, destroying the vessel. Losses in the state reached $14,000.

North Carolina 
A storm surge of  came ashore on Hatteras Island, inundating nearby areas. Minor flooding took place along several roads, including North Carolina Highway 12 which was shut down on Hatteras Island. A pier at Atlantic Beach was also damaged by rough seas. Numerous homes along the coast were flooded by rising waters, reaching  in places. An estimated 6,600 residences were left without power due to Hurricane Earl. In Manteo, a gas station lost its canopy and some homes lost roofing shingles due to high winds. Damage in Dare County totaled over $500,000 (2010 USD), with 79 houses in the county sustaining minor damage and another six receiving major damage, mainly due to storm surge. In neighboring Hyde County, strong winds caused about $2 million in crop damage. Several homes were also damaged by fallen trees in the Fairfield and Swan Quarter areas. Throughout the state, damage from Earl amounted to $3.88 million, mainly from losses sustained by national parks and agriculture. Nearly two weeks after Earl's passage, the North Carolina Department of Transportation began to pick up debris left alongside roads in the wake of the storm.

Mid-Atlantic 

After brushing North Carolina, Hurricane Earl brought moderate rains and gusty winds to parts of Virginia. Along the coast, large swells produced by the storm resulted in some beach erosion; however, no damage was reported. Throughout Delaware, the threat of Hurricane Earl lessened Labor Day weekend tourism. Many hotels across the state reached occupancies of 40-60%, significantly lower than initially expected. Along the coast, swells up to  resulted in minor tidal flooding, though no damage took place. Off the coast of New Jersey two people were killed after being swept out to sea by rip currents. The bodies of both victims were found after they washed onshore days after Earl's passage. Some beach erosion was reported along the coastline, with the worst being in Atlantic City. At the city's Garden Pier, the Historical Museum and the Atlantic City Arts Center was shut down indefinitely after electrical lines and pipes were damaged by waves. After nearly two weeks of beaches being shut down, swimmers were finally allowed to enter the water on September 5 throughout New Jersey.

In Long Island, New York, heavy surf produced by Earl inundated much of Jones Beach State Park, leading to officials closing the area for several days. By September 6, flood waters brought onshore by the storm still remained in the area despite continuous efforts to drain the water. Moderate beach erosion also took place in Robert Moses State Park. Similar impacts were felt in The Hamptons as many roads were temporarily shut down due to flooding. Rainfall from the storm peaked at  just outside Jamesport. Following the lack of damage caused by the storm, the Long Island Power Authority was criticized for excessive spending on emergency crews. An estimated $30 million was spent to bring in an additional 1,600 crewmen to deal with possible power outages despite forecasts showing Earl missing the state. Due to the excess funding, residents in New York were faced with increased rates for power. Additionally, New York senator Charles Fuschillo called for an audit of the power authority. It was later determined that LIPA had "jumped the gun" on the situation and brought in the assistance without necessity. In their defense, the agency claimed that "it [was] better to be safe than sorry", referring to the power outage following Hurricane Gloria in 1985 which affected parts of Long Island for over a week.

New England 

On August 31, several days prior to Earl's passage, rough seas produced by the storm killed a man in Massachusetts after he was knocked off rocks and pulled out to sea. During the height of the storm, heavy rains and winds up to  buffeted the coastline. Throughout the state, roughly 1,800 residences, roughly 600 of which were on Cape Cod, lost power due to downed trees and power lines. In the local harbors, most boats were unaffected by the storm; however, one did capsize. The most significant losses were to businesses who lost their Labor Day weekend revenue. Several hotels estimated that 10% of the revenue was lost, this equates to hundreds of thousands of dollars. One hotel in Yarmouth reported an 80% decrease in attendance despite a price cut from $130 to $85. On the other hand, supply stores saw improved sales, experiencing a 20% increase in revenues. Due to the lack of major damage from the storm, most businesses reopened on September 4 and tourists resumed their weekend plans. Throughout the state, Earl left $20,000 in damage.

In parts of Rhode Island, coastal flooding inundated low-lying roads, leaving ocean debris behind. Further north in Maine, the effects of Earl were limited to increased swells along the coast and moderate rainfall. Prior to Earl's arrival, a dry spell left several brooks and streams nearly empty; however, the rainfall from the storm alleviated the drought conditions. Only one road experienced flooding as a result of the rains. According to state transportation officials, northbound and southbound traffic along the Maine Turnpike was down 19% and 2.7% respectively, indicating that many tourists who were expected to travel to the region changed their plans.

Canada 

In Quebec, heavy rains from the storm amounted to at least ; however, reports from a storm chaser indicate that up to  may have fallen in Passes-Dangereuses. The strongest winds onshore reached  on Beaver Island. Sustained winds of at least  likely affected all of Nova Scotia, Prince Edward Island, much of Newfoundland, and parts of eastern New Brunswick, as well as extreme eastern Quebec and Labrador.

Throughout the affected region, about 252,000 residences, nearly one million people, were left without power as a result of Earl. Roughly 104,000 residences that lost power were in the Halifax metro area. The city received some of the worst impacts from the storm, experiencing near-hurricane-force winds around 12:00 pm (local time) on September 4. Several structures in the city were struck by fallen trees. At the height of the storm, Nova Scotia Routes 207, 331 and 333 were shut down due to flooding and downed power lines. Numerous trees and power lines were downed throughout Nova Scotia, blocking roads and damaging homes. Earl's only fatality in Canada occurred when one man drowned while trying to retrieve a boat which had been dislodged from its moorings.

Throughout Prince Edward Island, high winds left roughly 9,000 homes and businesses without power. Minor streets flooding and downed trees impeded travel throughout the area. In New Brunswick, little damage took place during Earl's passage; some trees were downed, resulting in scattered power outages. Along the St. George's Bay area in Newfoundland, numerous residents were left without power due to fallen trees and power lines. No injuries or major damage took place on the island and power was expected to be fully restored by the afternoon of September 5. Intense winds produced by the storm felled numerous trees, some more than 100 years old, and damaged homes.

Within hours of the storm's passage in Nova Scotia, hundreds of power crews were deployed to restore electricity as quickly as possible. Once winds dropped below , roughly 400 crewmen began fixing damaged lines. One lineman was injured after briefly coming into contact with live wires. Additional crews from New Brunswick, consisting of 18 trucks and 36 linemen, were deployed to the hardest hit regions. Roughly 90,000 Nova Scotia residences had their electricity restored by 10:00 pm the same night. By the morning of September 5, about 92,000 residences remained without power across Nova Scotia. It was not until September 7 that all residents affected by the storm had their power restored.

See also 

 Hurricane Bill (2009)
 Hurricane Helene (1958)
 Hurricane Irma (2017)
 Hurricane Luis (1995)
 Hurricane Earl (2022)
 Hurricane Fiona (2022)
 List of Category 4 Atlantic hurricanes
 Other storms named Earl
 List of North Carolina hurricanes (2000–present)
 List of New England hurricanes
 List of Canada hurricanes

References 

Earl
Earl (2010)
Earl (2010)
Earl (2010)
Earl (2010)
Earl (2010)
Earl (2010)
Earl (2010)
Earl (2010)
Earl (2010)
Earl (2010)
Earl (2010)
Earl (2010)
Earl(2010)
Earl(2010)
Earl (2010)
Earl(2010)
Earl(2010)
Earl(2010)
Earl(2010)
Earl(2010)
Earl(2010)
Earl(2010)
Earl(2010)
Earl(2010)
Earl(2010)
Earl (2010)
2010 natural disasters in the United States
2010 in the Caribbean
Articles containing video clips
2010 disasters in Canada
September 2010 events in the United States
Earl